Ashwin Hebbar (born 15 November 1995) is an Indian first-class cricketer who plays for Andhra Pradesh. He was the leading run-scorer for Andhra in the 2018–19 Vijay Hazare Trophy, with 299 runs in eight matches. In February 2022, he was bought by the Delhi Capitals in the auction for the 2022 Indian Premier League tournament.

References

External links
 

1995 births
Living people
Indian cricketers
Andhra cricketers
People from Nellore
Cricketers from Andhra Pradesh